Ennul Aayiram is a 2016 Indian Tamil-language thriller drama film written and directed by Krishna Kumar. It stars newcomers Maha and Marina Michael with Vincent Asokan and Krishnamoorthy in supporting roles. The film, which has music composed by Gopi Sundar, was released on 22 April 2016.

Cast
Maha as Ashok
Marina Michael as Suhasini 
Shruti Yugal
Vincent Asokan
R. S. Shivaji as Sadasivam
Swarupu Alias Karthic Shankar
Ravi Raj Krishna
Krishnamoorthy
Annamalai Palaniappan as Senthil

Production
In early 2015, the actor Delhi Ganesh chose to convert his theatre company Om Ganesh Creations into a production studio and launched a film starring his son, Maha, in the lead role. Titled Ennul Aayiram, the film featured newcomers with the Malayalam actress Marina Michael signed to play the leading female role. The idea of making a film first emerged after Maha was told a storyline by Krishna Kumar, an erstwhile assistant to the director A. L. Vijay, and Maha subsequently took the project to his father. Vincent Asokan was also signed to work on the film, ending his sabbatical from signing Tamil films, while Gopi Sunder was composed the film's music. Shooting was completed in 50 days in Chennai and Pondicherry.

Delhi Ganesh asked R. Madhavan to release a single online to promote the project, while Ganesh also convinced Kamal Haasan to release the film's audio soundtrack during February 2016.

Release and reception 
Ennul Aayiram was originally scheduled to release on 1 April 2016, but got postponed to 22 April. The Hindu wrote that "Ennul Aayiram exists almost just as an advertisement of his repertoire of skills". Malini Mannath of The New Indian Express opined that "Though not completely satisfactory in its take, Ennul Aayiram is a commendable effort from a debutant maker". A critic from The Times of India said that "Ennul Aayiram barely succeeds in keeping us hooked as the story progresses".

References

External links

2010s Tamil-language films
2010s thriller drama films
Indian thriller drama films